Lucy Tan is an American writer. She is the author of What We Were Promised, which was released by Little, Brown, & Company in 2018.

Early life 
Tan was raised in New Jersey, and splits her time between New York City and Shanghai. Her parents are from Wuhan, China. As a teenager, she traveled to China with a program meant to acquaint Chinese Americans with their parents' homeland, and experienced the Chinese countryside for the first time. When she moved to Shanghai after college, she was surprised by how modern it had become. When Tan was younger, she aspired to be an actress as well as a writer, and once appeared in a 2005 promo for MTV's My Super Sweet 16 alongside Jennifer Lawrence.

Writing 
Tan received her MFA in creative writing from University of Wisconsin-Madison, where she won the 2016 August Derleth Prize. Tan was a 2018–2019 James C. McCreight Fiction Fellow at the University of Wisconsin-Madison as well.

Tan is a Kundiman Fiction Fellow.

Tan won the 2015 Ploughshares Emerging Writer's Contest for her short story "Safety of Numbers."

What We Were Promised 
What We Were Promised follows a China-born family, the Zhens, who spent years chasing the American dream. When they return to contemporary Shanghai, they settle into a service apartment building and join a community of Chinese-born, Western-educated families in what they view to be a radically transformed city. Tan spent two years after college living with her parents in a luxury hotel, and this became the setting for her novel.  "

Publishers Weekly said What We Were Promised "presents an intriguing portrait of class, duty, and family."

USA Today said: "What We Were Promised glows through its intimate, skillful prose. Tan’s debut is a beautiful reckoning with the ever-changing definition of home – what it means to have, lose and find family again."

Kirkus Reviews said: "In the Zhen household, Tan brings us a microcosm of the conflicts among China’s larger populations: residents versus expatriates, wealthy versus poor, urban and commercial versus rural and agrarian. Humming quietly beneath the surface of the day-to-day microdrama in the Zhens’ home is the motif of the disappearance of Lina's talismanic ivory bracelet, the story of which reflects the rivalries between more than one set of characters in this portrait of people learning how to live after a period of immense repression."

References 

21st-century American women writers
21st-century American novelists
American women novelists
American women writers of Chinese descent
Living people
Year of birth missing (living people)
Writers from New Jersey
University of Wisconsin–Madison alumni